The Ledding Library of Milwaukie is a city-operated public library, a member of the Library Information Network of Clackamas County system, in Milwaukie, Oregon, United States. The branch offers the public with over three million books, periodicals and other materials.

Details
The current building is a one-story, 18,000 square-foot building opened in January 2020,  replacing a building which was constructed in 1964. During construction, the library operated out a temporary location set up in a TriMet park-and-ride.

The previous building had 2 levels: the main floor, and the basement, also called Rowe Children's Library. Dedicated on Dec. 16, 1964, the library had 11,800 square feet of floor space total.  As of 2013, the library was the third busiest in the county with 1.4 million annual transactions.

See also

 List of libraries in Oregon
 Vietnam War Memorial (Milwaukie, Oregon)

References

1964 establishments in Oregon
Libraries established in 1964
Libraries in Oregon
Milwaukie, Oregon